Gerton is an unincorporated community and census-designated place (CDP) in Henderson County, North Carolina, United States. As of the 2010 census it had a population of 254. It is part of the Asheville Metropolitan Statistical Area.

History
The area was first connected by a Drovers' road, a natural access into the interior of the Blue Ridge Mountains for drovers who were moving livestock, mostly flocks of turkeys and some geese, herds of hogs and some cattle in and out of the mountains to the markets. Established in 1798, it connected the area with Asheville, following on what is today U.S. Route 74A (US 74A). In 1883 the "Pump" Post Office was opened, named after a pump that supplied water off Bearwallow Mountain to the community in the valley. In 1902, the United States Post Office issued a new cancelling stamp for the post office, but had misspelled Pump as Rump. The residents, being both upset and embarrassed, decided to rename the community after a long-time and beloved school teacher in the community, Gertrude Freeman. However, having been known to be very shy and modest, it was decided to use a contraction of her name instead, Gerton.

Geography

Just northeast of the town is the Florence Nature preserve, containing several miles of hiking trails, and connecting to other trails surrounding the town.

Demographics

Services
Fire protection is provided by Gerton Fire and Rescue, which has a class 4 DOI rating.

References

External links
 Henderson County Visitors Information Center

Census-designated places in Henderson County, North Carolina
Census-designated places in North Carolina
Asheville metropolitan area